The Big Over Easy is a 2005 novel written by Jasper Fforde. It features Detective Inspector Jack Spratt and his assistant, Sergeant Mary Mary.

It is set in an alternate reality similar to that of his previous books: The Eyre Affair, Lost in a Good Book, The Well of Lost Plots and Something Rotten.

According to Fforde, The Big Over Easy is the result of the book Caversham Heights featured in The Well of Lost Plots and includes a possible cameo appearance of the author's heroine Thursday Next, thus verifying this claim.

The book was the first novel Fforde wrote, however, he failed in its publication. It was massively re-written following the success of the Thursday Next novels. A follow-up, entitled The Fourth Bear, was published in July 2006.

The book is satirical, based on many nursery rhymes, fables, and the like. The main character Jack Spratt is based on Jack Sprat, and the secondary character is Mary Mary, both from nursery rhymes. They investigate events such as the Three Little Pigs and Humpty Dumpty. People from such sources are known in the book as PDRs, "persons of dubious reality".

Plot

The book begins a short time after Easter, and no one can remember the last sunny day. Mary Mary, a detective sergeant from Basingstoke, is being transferred to Reading, Berkshire. She hopes to be paired up with Detective Chief Inspector Friedland Chymes, a member of the Detective's Guild with multiple appearances in the fictional magazine Amazing Crime Stories, but instead is paired up with Jack Spratt at the Nursery Crime Department, who is most famous for giant killing and for arresting the serial wife killer Bluebeard. Jack himself is living with his second wife, Madeleine, who moonlights as a photographer for certain prestigious events, and their five children: Pandora, Ben, Stevie, Jerome, and Megan. Madeleine is trying to rent the spare room in the house, but without much success. Jack's first wife could only eat fat and soon died.

The day after Mary is transferred, Humpty Dumpty is discovered dead outside of his residence at Grimm's Road, apparently having fallen off the wall. Jack's Superintendent, Briggs, introduces him to Mary Mary at the crime scene. Jack interviews some possible witnesses, including Wee Willie Winkie, the insomniac neighbor; Ms. Hubbard, the owner of the boarding house where Humpty stayed; and Prometheus, the titan from Greek mythology, the latter of which Jack offers to rent the spare room in his house to. They all describe Humpty as a nice egg, who generally kept to himself. Upon inspection of Humpty's room, Jack and Mary find some odd clues: several shares in Spongg Footcare, Reading's Footcare empire, a picture of Humpty with a girlfriend in Vienna, and a 28-foot-long strand of hair. They later interview Laura, Humpty Dumpty's ex-wife. When Jack returns home, he tells his mother that the painting of the cow his mother wanted to sell was fake and he only received some beans in return. Mrs. Spratt retorts that she had the painting valued years ago and that the auctioneer probably knows how incredibly valuable it is. She is so upset that she throws the beans out of the window, and Jack sees them bury into the ground by themselves.

There is another interview at a hospital called Saint Cerebellum's, this time with mad scientist doctor Quatt, and on their way to meeting her Jack notices the serial killer the 'Gingerbread Man'. Jack had been chasing the killer in previous cases and had to witness his colleague having his arms ripped off, only for the local newspaper, the Gadfly, to say that Chymes had caught the 'Gingerbread Man'. The interview with Dr. Quatt only reveals that she was Humpty's doctor. The conversation ends with Quatt showing Jack and Mary her latest experiment, a kitten's head sewn onto the body of a haddock.

A few days later, Jack and Mary team up with Superintendent Baker, Ashley (an alien who can only speak binary code) and forensic scientist Gretel Kandlestyck-Maeker. Humpty Dumpty's wife is found to have committed suicide at the biscuit factory, but it is suspected that she has been murdered. The woman had jumped into a chocolate vat and was sliced by the machines, but when the employees stopped the machine, it was too late. The police of the Nursery Crime Division find a suicide note, but Mary concludes that it was written by his wife by comparing it to her diary. The proof of suicide also comes from a witnessing employee who saw her jump in, and no one pushed her.

A few days later, the team are called in to investigate the recent death of Wee Willie Winkie. He was attacked with a large weapon, supposedly a broadsword, and a fifty-pound note was found in his hand, showing he was blackmailing the killer. Jack has his own problems at home when his mother calls him to sell a painting of a cow.

Jack next interviews Randolph Spongg. Humpty had been investing in their failing businesses in hope of a breakthrough, which never came. The interview take place in Spongg's strange house, where doors lead nowhere, some rooms revolve around and go-kart races inside the house itself are held commonly every year. They next interview Lola Vavoom, who lives in the room next to Humpty Dumpty in the block of flats. At the end of the conversation she tells them that Humpty's shower had been running for a whole year, before his death. The two men break the door, and Baker finds a skeleton in the shower.

The man is identified as Tom Thomm, son of a local flautist. His skin has been washed away by the shower water, and his skeleton is badly damaged. There are also five bullet holes in the shower curtain, three at waist height and two at foot height. Gretel says that when Tom was shot in the waist, he fell on the floor, where the two other shots hit his head. Jack then realises that Tom's killer was Humpty's wife: the three waist-height shots would have been head height for Humpty. His wife killed herself as she was sorry for what she had done.

Jack is interviewed by colleagues, and Friedland Chymes appears and warns Spratt that if he does not give the case to Chymes, he will be fired. Jack accepts that that may happen, and refuses to give the case away. Later on, they have a meeting with another industrialist, Solomon Grundy, whose wife is Rapunzel. When she takes off her hat and her hair falls to the ground, Spratt and Mary remember the 28-foot-long strand of hair found in Humpty's bedroom. Solomon shows them into a room with an abnormally large amount of security: a person going in has to wear no shoes in case of being detected. In the centre of the room is a puzzle piece, the sacred gonga, held in unbreakable glass. It has magic powers which he reveals to Jack and Mary by putting them on each side of the room. When Jack thinks of a number, Mary says it out loud. This was so amazing that Solomon decided to put it on display for everyone in Reading.

When an inspector is put in charge of watching Spratt and the others, Humpty's car, a Ford Zephyr, is found. As the car is about to be taken away, Jack realises that the front headlight has been removed and there is a wire feeding through it. He orders everyone to run away and the car explodes. Spratt and Mary then interview a woman who was divorced from Humpty. The woman claims that she killed Humpty out of jealousy by putting three poisonous tablets in his coffee. Jack then tells her that Humpty was shot, not poisoned, and that she is therefore innocent.

When Jack returns home, he notices a huge crowd of people around the house. His mother says that the beans that were thrown from the window had grown into a huge stalk. She has even made arrangements for the magical celebrity, the Jellyman, to see it when he arrives in Reading. Jack is told by Gretel that Humpty Dumpty was shot by someone from behind, which smashed through his shell and burst the albumen, sending a shock which cracked the whole egg.

When Mary, Spratt and the inspector enter Humpty's house, they wonder how Humpty got his money: he had no proper job and all he did was invest in failing companies. Their question is answered when they discover on the sofa a goose that lays golden eggs. On a further inspection, a giant verruca is found on another sofa. Jack then remembers a strange doctor, Horatio Carbuncle, who always made living things like the verruca. He killed Humpty Dumpty because he was investing in a company which got rid of verrucas. Humpty's wife killed herself because she thought that she had killed him, and Wee Willie Winkie was killed because he was blackmailing him. Jack is not sure about Tom, but thought the evidence is good enough. Mary then calls him into the next room and shows him the body of Carbuncle, shot dead.

Jack then remembers the verruca and the puzzle piece. If Randolph was the killer, he would have the best motive so that he could put the verruca under the floor of Solomon's room. Hundreds of people would come in bare-footed to see the puzzle piece, and the verruca would give off a gas which would infect all the people's feet with verrucas. They would turn to the only foot care product, made by Randolph Spongg, and the failing company would make thousands.

Jack is told that the man who shot Humpty was employed by Solomon Grundy, but Jack knows that Solomon is not the killer and sets off to find the real one, Randolph Spongg. Arriving at the house, the butler asks him to remove his mobile. The room becomes strange and starts to revolve. Jack enters a normal room with a mirror next, but he cannot see himself in the reflection. He sees Randolph and Lola come out of a trapdoor, and turns round, but sees no one. Randolph explains that this is his magic. Lola says that she is happy that Humpty is dead in the Ford Zephyr and reveals that she loves Randolph. Behind the two, the butler comes out of the trapdoor, but to Jack's surprise the butler is behind him. Jack is confused as he is standing in front of a mirror and cannot see his reflection, but that of Randolph and Lola, and the butler is the only one with a reflection. Randolph puts a sandwich with tin foil inside on a table and shines a lamp on it. He explains that the sandwich will crumple up under the heat, and when the corners of the tin foil touch, the house will explode. When they leave, Jack realises that it is not a mirror at all, but glass. He breaks it and finds a room on the other side, made exactly backwards. The butler had a twin brother who appeared on the other side, looking like he had a reflection. Jack stops the bomb, but the killers escape in a plane. After talking to Mary, he thinks that the car bomb was not intended for them, but for Humpty. He gets this idea because Lola said that Humpty died in the Zephyr, so was hoping he would be killed in it.

Moments later, Jack is informed by Gretel that Humpty survived the shot, and that instead, he hatched, because Dr. Quatt secretly fecundated him in vitro. The team are thrown into confusion as they try to find a giant chicken which they think Humpty hatched into. Spratt and Mary then return to his house to attend the arrival of 'his eminence' the Jellyman. When he looks at the stalk, Jack has an urge to climb it. The only people in the house are a few police officers, Spratt, Mary, the Jellyman, Madeleine and their children. The few police officers stationed outside the house are alerted, and one by one, a strange creature kills them all. The monster bursts into the house in an attempt to kill the Jellyman. Jack leads him outside and climbs the stalk, followed by the beast. When they are high up in the sky, the monster rips Jack off and he falls all the way through the garden shed. When Jack regains consciousness, he sees a chainsaw. He is reminded of the axe and takes it and begins hacking down the beanstalk, aiming for the beast to fall down. It jumps onto him and tries to kill him, but a voice behind it makes it stop. Dr. Quatt appears in front of Jack and tells him that she is the killer, whose aim was to kill the Jellyman all along. She is about to kill Jack, but Mary knocks her unconscious. The monster runs to her aid, picking her up and running away. Mary tries to kill them, but Jack tells her not to bother. The beanstalk topples over from when Jack tried to cut it down, crushing the monster and Dr. Quatt.

The end of the book is the explanation. Scientists take away the goose that lays golden eggs and cut it open to find out what makes it lay these eggs, but are disappointed to find only find a normal goose's insides. Jack explains to Mary that Humpty, although a good egg, had many friends and many enemies. His previous wife thought she killed him by poison, his wife thought she killed him by shooting him in the shower, Solomon Grundy thought he killed him by hiring a man to shoot him, Randolph Spongg and Lola Vavoom thought they killed him with a car bomb. But the real killer was Dr. Quatt, who injected him with the monster when he was having his appointments with her. Humpty's wife killed herself because she thought she killed him. Wee Willie Winkie saw Humpty hatch and knew it was her and blackmailed her. She made the monster follow her, and when she met him, the beast killed him with its claw. Her plan was to kill the Jellyman and used Humpty as a host to create the monster. She only wanted to kill one person, but a lot of others were the victim of her powerful, and short wrath.

Characters in "The Big Over Easy"
Detective Inspector Jack Spratt: head of the Nursery Crime Division and also a nursery rhyme character himself. His name is a reference to the Jack Sprat rhyme but the character also fulfils the role of Jack in Jack and the Beanstalk and Jack the Giant Killer.
Sergeant Mary Mary: based upon the rhyme Mary, Mary, Quite Contrary.
Constable Baker: Jack's helper and part of the Nursery Crime Division. He, Jack's former sergeant Alan Butcher and Gretel were used to make Butcher, Baker and Kandlstyck-Maeker ("Three Men in a Tub").
Constable Ashley: An alien that can stick to walls and speaks binary code.
Gretel Kandlestyck-Maeker: Forensic accountant to the Nursery crime Division. She is used in the rhyme "Three Men in a Tub" (see above).
Mrs Singh: Forensic scientist for the NCD
Superintendent Briggs: Jack's boss, who plays the trombone and tried to change his name to "become more interesting."
Friedland Chymes: The Divisions' most intelligent of detectives, who can solve cases through the tiniest of clues. Later, however, he is exposed as a fraud by Jack.
William Winkie: The narcoleptic neighbour of Humpty Dumpty. He blackmailed the killer and was killed.
Humpty Dumpty: A giant egg. He had many marriages and divorces. He was murdered in his garden.
Mrs. Hubbard: The owner of the boarding house where Humpty Dumpty lived.

Release details
11 July 2005, Hodder & Stoughton Ltd, hardback

Critical reception
Reviewing the book for UK Sunday newspaper The Observer, Peter Guttridge began by writing, "I'm not sure what it says about the mystery genre that pretty much the only unflawed, untroubled, morally unambiguous policeman around is a nursery rhyme character". He added, "Now humour is notoriously subjective […]. And, indeed, when Fforde wrote the first version of this novel in 1994 - he called it Who Killed Humpty Dumpty? - it was rejected by every publisher he sent it to. But I love it. The Big Over Easy is great not just because it's very funny (albeit with some excruciating puns) but also because it works properly as a whodunit. Although I was wrong to say Spratt is untroubled. As a conflation of three nursery rhyme Jacks, he has several 'issues' to deal with, including the need for a fat-free diet and a strong compulsion to kill giants." Guttridge concluded his review saying simply, "Comic genius".

Reviewing the audiobook edition, read by Simon Prebble, Publishers Weekly found that, "Despite its many virtues, this is probably Fforde's weakest novel, lacking the literary sophistication of the Thursday Next books. But Prebble's performance easily makes this Fforde's best audiobook to date".

See also

BookWorld

Notes

External links
The official Nursery Crime Division website

2005 British novels
British fantasy novels
Novels by Jasper Fforde
2005 fantasy novels
Novels set in Berkshire
Hodder & Stoughton books
Works based on nursery rhymes
Metafictional novels